Frederick Snowden (c. 1936 – January 17, 1994) was an American businessman and men's basketball coach at the University of Arizona.  Nicknamed "The Fox" for his cool demeanor, he was the first African-American head coach at a major university.  Following his coaching career Snowden became an executive with Baskin-Robbins and the Food 4 Less foundation.

Background
Snowden was born in Brewton, Alabama, the son of a sharecropper.  At age 6 he moved to Detroit, Michigan with his mother and two brothers while his father remained in Alabama.  He graduated from Detroit's Northwestern High School.  Snowden met his wife, Maya, at Wayne State University and was married in 1962.  The couple had two children: a son, Charles Anthony, and a daughter, Stacey Shannon.

Following college, Snowden worked as a basketball coach at his old high school.  During his five-year tenure, the school's junior varsity team compiled a record of 90 wins to no losses while the varsity squad had a record of 87 wins and 7 losses.  Snowden then worked as a sportscaster on local radio and television before becoming an assistant coach at the University of Michigan under Dave Strack and Johnny Orr.

University of Arizona
In 1972, Snowden became the first African-American head coach at a major university and the second black head coach at a Division I school, following Illinois State's Will Robinson, when he was hired at the University of Arizona in Tucson. Following his first season, he was also named Western Athletic Conference (WAC) Coach of the Year, Tucson's Man of the Year, and hosted two television shows. Under Snowden's tutelage, the Arizona program continued to succeed for several years, making the NCAA tournament twice, reaching the Elite Eight in 1976.

Arizona's success under Snowden faded following their move to the Pacific-10 Conference in 1978, with his final three seasons resulting in losing records. In January 1982, he announced his resignation, effective at the end of the season. At the time of the announcement there were allegations that he had been involved with the improper use of a university slush fund, a charge that Snowden denied.  A later NCAA investigation found no evidence Snowden had acted improperly.  He was inducted into the University of Arizona hall of fame in 1988.

Post-coaching career
Following the end of his coaching career, Snowden became a management consultant and operated his own business.  In 1985 he was hired by Baskin-Robbins as vice president overseeing the company's National Metropolitan Franchise Expansion Program.   Snowden later left Baskin-Robbins and became executive director of the Food 4 Less foundation.

Snowden's death came on January 17, 1994.  While traveling to Washington, D.C. to attend a White House ceremony, he suffered a heart attack while at a convenience store and died at George Washington Hospital.

Head coaching record

References

1936 births
1994 deaths
American men's basketball coaches
American men's basketball players
Arizona Wildcats men's basketball coaches
Basketball coaches from Alabama
Basketball coaches from Michigan
Basketball players from Alabama
Basketball players from Detroit
High school basketball coaches in the United States
Michigan Wolverines men's basketball coaches
People from Brewton, Alabama
Northwestern High School (Michigan) alumni
Wayne State Warriors men's basketball players
Year of birth uncertain